The title Minister responsible for the Economic Development Agency of Canada for the Regions of Quebec was accorded to full members of the Cabinet of Canada from the Campbell Ministry through the first months of Paul Martin government.  Prior to the agency's renaming in 1998, the position was termed Minister responsible for the Federal Office of Regional Development – Quebec.

Ministers responsible have included Jean Charest, Paul Martin, and John Manley.

In 2002, Claude Drouin became the only Secretary of State for the Economic Development Agency of Canada for the regions of Quebec that was created to succeed from the former position of Secretary of State (Federal Office of Regional Development – Quebec) which had existed since 1996 with Martin Cauchon in the position. When Prime Minister Paul Martin did away with the sub-Cabinet position of Secretary of State, he reverted the structure to how it had been constituted before 1996, with Industry Minister Lucienne Robillard assuming the title.

After the 2004 Canadian election the portfolio was cut loose as an autonomous office, the Minister of the Economic Development Agency of Canada for the Regions of Quebec, and given to Jacques Saada. 

The pre-2004 portfolio was revived when Pascale St-Onge was appointed to be responsible for it in 2021. St-Onge holds the office concurrently with Minister for Sport.

Ministers
Key:

Martin Cauchon handled most day-to-day responsibilities for this portfolio as Secretary of State (Federal Office of Regional Development – Quebec) from January 25, 1996 to February 12, 1998, and continued as Secretary of State (Economic Development Agency for the Regions of Quebec) until January 14, 2002.  His replacement, Claude Drouin, would handle virtually all responsibilities for this portfolio as Secretary of State (Economic Development Agency for the Regions of Quebec) for the remainder of the Chrétien Ministry.

The portfolio became a full-fledged ministerial posting, Minister of the Economic Development Agency of Canada for the Regions of Quebec, in 2004.

Economic Development Agency Of Canada For Quebec